Sims Records was a country music record label in the 1950s and 1960s.

History
Russell Sims had been associated with Country music in the late 1940s and early 1950s and became a sort of touring manager for T. Texas Tyler who was a Four Star Records artist.  A meeting with Fabor Robison in 1951 allowed Sims to witness  the birth of Robison's Abbott Records and Fabor labels and gave him the desire to start his own record company.
Sims Records began in Los Angeles in the early 1950s with a financial grant from Robison who was already successful with Jim Reeves ánd began to record local Country musicians.
After an unsuccessful start, Sims relocated to Nashville in the early 1960s and began to add Black Gospel and R&B musicians to his roster. One of his releases by The Kelly Brothers sold well, but by the late 1968 Sims was running short of money and the company was put in "Mothballs".
In 1999 Sims re-opened his label with a multi-disc set of Bob Wills music.

See also 
 List of record labels

External links
 singles discography
 Sims Records Home Page
 Sims Records 45's & albums - many label scans and album covers

Record labels established in 1951
American country music record labels
Rhythm and blues record labels
American companies established in 1951